Rachel Kondo is an American writer and television supervising producer. Her short story "Girl of Few Seasons" was a finalist for the O. Henry Award. Alongside her husband Justin Marks, she is also a supervising producer for the re-adaptation of Shōgun.

Early life and career
Kondo is of Japanese descent. She grew up in Pukalani, Hawaii, and received a $1,000 scholarship as a senior in high school. Kondo pursued her Master of Fine Arts at the Michener Center for Writers at the University of Texas at Austin. During her time there, she was a finalist for the 2014 Keene Prize for Literature and received part of the $50,000 runner-up prize.

In 2017, her husband Justin Marks chose her to work as a supervising producer for the re-adaptation of Shōgun.

References

Living people
Writers from Hawaii
Hawaii people of Japanese descent
American women short story writers
American women writers of Asian descent
University of California, Los Angeles alumni
University of Texas at Austin alumni
American writers of Japanese descent
American short story writers of Asian descent
Year of birth missing (living people)
21st-century American women
O. Henry Award winners